The Robber Bridegroom is a 1942 novella by Eudora Welty.

The story, inspired by and loosely based on the Grimm fairy tale The Robber Bridegroom, is a Southern folk tale set in Mississippi. At the opening of the novella, the legendary Mike Fink meets gentleman robber Jamie Lockhart, and Lockhart comes out on top.  The story follows Clement Musgrove back to his home on the Natchez Trace, where he lives with his daughter, Rosamund, and second wife, Salome.  Lockhart kidnaps Rosamund, and the two quickly fall in love.

The novel utilizes aspects of the Cupid and Psyche myth. It was adapted by Alfred Uhry and Robert Waldman into a musical of the same name in the early seventies and opened for a short run on Broadway in 1976.

References

1942 American novels
Novels by Eudora Welty
American novellas
American folklore
Novels set in Mississippi
Doubleday (publisher) books
The Bodley Head books
1942 debut novels
Works based on The Golden Ass